Darlington is an unincorporated community and census-designated place in northeastern Harford County, Maryland, United States. The population was 409 at the 2010 census. The center of the community was listed on the National Register of Historic Places as the Darlington Historic District in 1987. Median household income is $66,563. The percentage of people in poverty is 5.3%.

Geography
Darlington is located in northeastern Harford County at  (39.502757, −76.318971), along Maryland Route 161. U.S. Route 1 crosses the northern side of the community, leading northeast  to Philadelphia and southwest  to Baltimore.

Demographics

Historic sites

The southern part of the CDP, south of Shuresville Road, is part of the Darlington Historic District, listed on the National Register of Historic Places (NRHP) in 1987. There are approximately 100 contributing properties, including buildings by architects such as Theophilus Parsons Chandler, Jr. and Walter Cope. The village was also home to Harry Webb Farrington.

History
There is evidence for settlement in the town around 1700, but not much before that time. Darlington had a stagecoach line to Baltimore and a lot of traffic from the Susquehanna and the Tidewater Canal had to go through it.

The Darlington Academy was built in 1836 and used to be a popular school in Harford County. Additionally, almost 100 years later in 1928 the Conowingo Dam was built and made it easier to travel across.

Community

Local children attend the Darlington Elementary School near the center of town. The elementary school has one class per grade level (K through 5), and two autism classrooms. There is no high school in Darlington, so students usually enroll in Havre De Grace High School.

An annual apple festival is held in Darlington the first Saturday in October, and attracts almost 60,000 people.

Darlington and the surrounding communities are provided fire and EMS service by the Darlington Volunteer hobbyist Company.

The Darlington public library, formally located within the town, was moved to the nearby intersection of Maryland Route 136 and U.S. Route 1 in October of 2022. Darlington also has several houses of worship, including Franklin Baptist Church, Harmony Presbyterian Church, Grace Episcopal Church, Darlington United Methodist Church, Deer Creek Friends Meetinghouse, and Hosanna AME Church located in historic Berkley, Maryland.

Photos of Darlington

References

External links
Darlington Historic District, Harford County, Maryland Historical Trust

 
Census-designated places in Harford County, Maryland
Census-designated places in Maryland
Historic districts on the National Register of Historic Places in Maryland
National Register of Historic Places in Harford County, Maryland